Eucilinus is a genus of broad-nosed weevils in the beetle family Curculionidae. There are at least three described species in Eucilinus.

Species
These three species belong to the genus Eucilinus:
 Eucilinus aridus (Van Dyke, 1938) i c g b
 Eucilinus hirsutus Hatch, 1971 i c g
 Eucilinus mononychus Buchanan, 1926 i c g
Data sources: i = ITIS, c = Catalogue of Life, g = GBIF, b = Bugguide.net

References

Further reading

 
 
 
 

Entiminae
Articles created by Qbugbot